Jacob Storevik (born 29 July 1996) is a Norwegian footballer who plays as a goalkeeper for Vålerenga.

Career

Storevik started his senior career in Florø in 2012 before leaving for Rosenborg later that year after having impressed Rosenborg at under 16 level and on trail for Rosenborg in the NextGen Series.  Storevik's first match squad for Rosenborg was in the Europa League group stage game away at Bayer Leverkusen in 2012, he stayed on the bench the whole game. He was given jersey number 33 and was the third goalkeeper for Rosenborg for the 2014 season.

After spells on the second and third tier with Levanger and Florø he signed for second-tier Sandefjord ahead of the 2019 season. Securing promotion, he played the season opener of the 2020 Eliteserien.

References

1996 births
Living people
People from Førde
Norwegian footballers
Florø SK players
Rosenborg BK players
Levanger FK players
Sandefjord Fotball players
Norwegian First Division players
Eliteserien players
Association football goalkeepers
Sportspeople from Vestland